The Halifax Alehouse is an historic, brick building originally built for the Salvation Army on Brunswick Street in downtown Halifax, Nova Scotia. The building is located at the base of the Halifax Citadel and hosts a bar/restaurant.

Salvation Army Citadel
The building was the Salvation Army's first permanent temple in Halifax, and was constructed on the site of the Mackenzie Temperance Reform Club, a group that promoted abstinence from alcohol. The Reform Club building was occupied by the Salvation Army from 1892 to 1893 before it was demolished.

Construction of the Salvation Army Citadel temple was started in 1893 and completed in 1895. It served as the headquarters and central place of worship for the Salvation Army in Halifax until 1961 when a new temple was constructed on Barrington Street.

The building was designed by architect Henry Busch, and uses multi-wythe load-bearing brick walls. It is considered an example of the Second Empire architectural style with Gothic Revival influences.

Bar and restaurant
The building has contained a bar and restaurant for several decades. In the 1990s, it was home to Jerry's Pub. As of December 2019, the building was owned by Jehad Khoury Holdings Ltd.

Halifax Alehouse
The most recent iteration, the Halifax Alehouse, is modeled as a traditional Maritime brew pub, with décor that emphasizes history and tradition, and a staff that wears period costumes. The bar is known for its wide range of East Coast beers (with 29 on tap).  The menu is traditional pub fare, but specializes in Belgian mussels. The bar also hosts live music, especially from Celtic derived bands.
 
Bands who have played the Alehouse include Satori, The Frequency, Shameless, Ten Mile House, Kapyr (10 years of Wednesdays), The Persuaders, The Morning After, "The Legendary" Frankie Deuce, Frisky Biscuit, UP, Green with Envy, Merimac.

The Halifax Alehouse is owned by Michel and Marcel Khoury, while Peter Zed is the recognized agent of the business under Nova Scotian law.

Human rights complaint
The Halifax Alehouse was the subject of a human rights complaint in relation to a 2010 incident in which a 32-year-old black patron, Dino Gilpin, was asked to leave after the bar refused to accept his citizenship card as a valid form of identification for the purpose of purchasing an alcoholic drink. After he refused to leave, the Halifax Alehouse phoned police, who arrested Gilpin and charged him with public drunkenness. In 2013, the Nova Scotia Human Rights Commission ruled that the Halifax Alehouse racially discriminated against him in phoning the police. The commission also found that Gilpin was not intoxicated.

Allegations of violence
Halifax Alehouse security staff have been involved in various violent incidents. In 2009, a scuffle between photography students and a Halifax Alehouse bouncer on the public sidewalk outside the bar made local news.

Following a December 2022 murder (see below), The Coast reported on a man who said he was beaten by multiple Halifax Alehouse staff on 25 June 2022 in the venue's back stairwell, out of view of other patrons, after being escorted out of the bar by three bouncers. The man said he suffered numerous injuries including a fractured rib, but decided not to press charges due to personal circumstances. The Halifax Alehouse did not respond to the newspaper's repeated inquiries.

On 14 August 2022, Addisiane Freeland was "badly beaten by bouncers at the Alehouse", according to local media. A notice of action filed against the Alehouse in relation to this incident alleged that multiple bouncers inflected physical injury and psychological trauma on the man. A video allegedly depicting the assault was posted to social media website Reddit. The video shows a man being punched multiple times while not moving, being pinned to the ground by several people.

Halifax police charged two staff of the Halifax Alehouse, Matthew Day and Alexander Levy, with assault in relation to another incident that took place on 10 October 2022. A man, who was being restrained outside the bar by Alehouse staff when police arrived, alleged that he had been assaulted by them. Speaking to CBC News, the man said he had been told to leave without being given a reason, and was escorted out of the bar. He recounted that once outside the bar he turned to leave, but was attacked by multiple bouncers and was beaten and choked unconscious on the sidewalk.

On 24 December 2022, Ryan Michael Sawyer was killed outside the Halifax Alehouse. Sawyer was visiting Halifax to watch the 2023 World Junior Ice Hockey Championships. Online accounts suggested that the assault involved staff of the Halifax Alehouse, but as of January 2023 this has not been confirmed by Halifax police nor the Halifax Alehouse. A complaint filed on 25 December 2022 with the provincial Alcohol, Gaming, Fuel and Tobacco Division alleged that staff of the Halifax Alehouse have been, for the past several years, "overly eager to resort to violence". The murder remains under police investigation.

References

Buildings and structures in Halifax, Nova Scotia
Former Salvation Army citadels
Religious buildings and structures completed in 1895
Restaurants in Nova Scotia
Second Empire architecture in Canada